I Sometimes Wish I Was Famous: A Swedish Tribute to Depeche Mode is a tribute album to the British band Depeche Mode, released in May 1991 by Swedish label Energy Rekords, to celebrate the 10th anniversary of Depeche Mode's debut single, "Dreaming of Me" (1981). It was the first tribute album to Depeche Mode.

The album title refers to "I Sometimes Wish I Was Dead", a song included on Depeche Mode's Speak & Spell album, also released in 1981.

Track listing

Vinyl

CD

References

External links
 
 

Depeche Mode tribute albums
1991 compilation albums
Synth-pop compilation albums
Industrial compilation albums
Dark wave compilation albums
Energy Records compilation albums